The Original Memphis Five was an early jazz quintet founded in 1917 by trumpeter Phil Napoleon and pianist Frank Signorelli. Jimmy Lytell was a member from 1922 to 1925. The group made many recordings between 1921 and 1931, sometimes under different names, including Ladd's Black Aces and The Cotton Pickers. Richard Cook and Brian Morton, writing for The Penguin Guide to Jazz, refer to the group as "one of the key small groups of the '20s".

The group formed around 1917. The name Original Memphis Five was first used in 1920, and applied to small groups of white musicians throughout the decade. The Ladd's Black Aces name was used from 1921 until 1924. Cook and Morton identify Jimmy Lytell and Miff Mole as standout musicians in the group. Jimmy Durante played piano with Ladd's Black Aces, while both Tommy and Jimmy Dorsey were members of the Original Memphis Five.  Occasional vocalists were Anna Meyers, Annette Hanshaw and Vernon Dalhart (as George White).

Both Red Nichols and Miff Mole later led their own groups named Original Memphis Five. Phil Napoleon, however, would continue using the group name into the 1980s.

References

External links
 Original Memphis Five at The Red Hot Jazz Archive

Vocalion Records artists
Musical groups established in 1917
American jazz ensembles
Dixieland ensembles